Badri Prasad Bajoria (1925–1976) was an Indian social worker, philanthropist, educationist and the founder of Shri Baldev Dass Bajoria Inter College, Kamala Devi Bajoria Degree College and Seth Baldev Dass Bajoria District Hospital. He was born in 1925 in Saharanpur in the Indian state of Uttar Pradesh to Kamla Devi and Baldev Dass Bajoria and was married to Savitri Devi. He was the co-founder of institutions such as Shrimati Kamla Devi Saraswati Shishu Mandir, Bajoria Sanatan Dharam Sankirtan Bhawan and  Gandhi centenary Kamla Devi Bajoria Memorial Ganna Eye Hospital. He was honoured by the Government of India in 1972 with the Padma Shri, the fourth highest Indian civilian award.

References

Recipients of the Padma Shri in social work
1925 births
1976 deaths
People from Saharanpur district
Social workers
20th-century Indian educational theorists
Social workers from Uttar Pradesh
20th-century Indian philanthropists